The Barakhamba Road Metro Station is located on the Blue Line of the Delhi Metro. It  was constructed by the Shapoorji Pallonji Group.

It is located on Barakhamba Road near Modern School and the Statesman House, which houses many offices, banks, the Oxford bookstore and numerous other commercial institutions.

Structure

Station layout

See also

List of Delhi Metro stations
Transport in Delhi
Delhi Metro Rail Corporation
Delhi Suburban Railway
List of rapid transit systems in India

References

External links

 Delhi Metro Rail Corporation Ltd. (Official site) 
 Delhi Metro Annual Reports
 

 UrbanRail.Net – descriptions of all metro systems in the world, each with a schematic map showing all stations.

Delhi Metro stations
Railway stations opened in 2005
2005 establishments in Delhi
Railway stations in New Delhi district